Francisca Jorge (born 21 April 2000) is a Portuguese tennis player.

Jorge has won four singles and 18 doubles titles on the ITF Women's Circuit.

Playing for Portugal Fed Cup team, she has won 11 and lost 15 rubbers in the 18 ties she has played since 2017.

Jorge is the older sister of fellow tennis player Matilde Jorge.

ITF Circuit finals

Singles: 7 (4 titles, 3 runner–ups)

Doubles: 38 (18 titles, 20 runner–ups)

References

External links
 
 
 

2000 births
Living people
Portuguese female tennis players
21st-century Portuguese women